The Para ice hockey competition of the 2022 Winter Paralympics was held at the Beijing National Indoor Stadium, China, from 5 to 13 March 2022. A total of seven teams competed in the mixed team tournament.

Yu Jing from China has become the third female Para ice hockey player at the Paralympic Games, preceded by Britt Mjaasund Øyen and Lena Schrøder from Norway who previously competed in para ice hockey at the Winter Paralympics.

Medalists

Qualification

Match officials
5 referees and 7 linesmen were selected for the tournament.

Referees
 Kevin Webinger
 Jacob Grumsen
 Kenneth Danielsen
 Owe Lüthcke
 Bobby Esposito

Linesmen
 David Nothegger
 Matt Fergenbaum
 Jan Vaněk
 Louis Beelen
 Tibor Fazekaš
 Andreas Lundén
 Tony Rundström

Preliminary round
All times are local (UTC+8).

Group A

Group B

Playoff round

Bracket

Quarterfinals

Semifinals

Seventh place game

Fifth place game

Bronze medal game

Gold medal game

Final ranking

Statistics

Scoring leaders
List shows the top ten skaters sorted by points, then goals.

GP = Games played; G = Goals; A = Assists; Pts = Points; +/− = Plus/minus; PIM = Penalties in minutes; POS = PositionSource: Beijing 2022

Leading goaltenders
Only the top five goaltenders, based on save percentage, who have played at least 40% of their team's minutes, are included in this list.
TOI = Time on ice (minutes:seconds); GA = Goals against; GAA = Goals against average; SA = Shots against; Sv% = Save percentage; SO = ShutoutsSource: Beijing 2022

Awards

Best players selected by the Directorate

All-Star team

Notes

References

External links
 Results book

2022 Winter Paralympics events
Paralympics, Winter
 
2022
2022